Valeriy Sharapov is a Habil. doctor (doctor of engineering sciences), professor, head of department of computer-assisted and informative technologies in the instrument-making of the Cherkassy State Technological University.

He graduated from Chemical Technological College at Shostkа (explosives production) in 1962, from a branch of Moscow Engineering and Physical Institute (MEPHI)  in 1969 (automatics and electronics of nuclear facilities).

He received PhD degree (candidate’s degree) at Tomsk Institute of Automatics, Electronics and Control Systems. He received Doctorate degree at Odessa National Polytechnic University (Ukraine).

He worked at the nuclear center in Russian Federation, scientific and industrial complex of “Photopribor”, research institute of “Chimanalyt” and the scientific production association  “Phonon”

He is the author of more than 900 scientific publications, inclusive 19 monographs and manuals  and more than 500 patents for inventions.

Publications

Sharapov V. Piezoceramic sensors. – Springer Verlag, 2011. – 498 p. According to WorldCat, the book is held in 241  libraries 
Sharapov V.M. et al. Piezoelectric sensors. - Moscow: Technosphera, 2006.- 632p.
Sharapov V.M. et al. Sensors. - Moscow: Technosphera, 2012. - 616 p.
Sharapov V.M. Baybakov F.B. Control of admixtures in compressed gases. - Moscow: Chemistry, 1989. – 160 p.
Sharapov V.M. et al. Piezoceramic transducers of physical sizes.- Cherkasy: ChGTU, 2005.– 631p.
Sharapov V.M. et al. Automatic control theory. Manual. Cherkasy: CHSTU, 2005. - 200 p.
Sharapov V.M. et al. Piezoceramic transformers and sensors. – Cherkasy: Vertical, 2010. – 278 p.
Sharapov V.M. et al. Capacitive sensors. – Cherkasy: Brama-Ukraine, 2010.–184p.
Sharapov V.M., Sotula Zh.V., Kunitskaya L.G. Piezoelectric electroacoustic transducers. – Cherkasy: Vertical, 2012.-255p.
Sharapov V.M., Sharapova E.V. Universal technologies of management. Moscow: Technosphera, 2006. - 496 p.
Sharapov V.M. et al. Piezoelectric transducers. The handbook. - Cherkasy: ChGTU, 2004. – 435 p.
Sharapov V.M. et al. Programmed logic controllers in the automatic control systems: the manual. -2-е The edition. – Stavropol: АGRUS, 2010. – 128p.
Sharapov V.M., Sharapova E.V. Technologies of management: Practical management. – Cherkasy: ChGTU, 2005.- 563p.
Sharapov V.M. and others. Technologies of instrument-making.–Cherkasy: Brama, 2009.–320p.
Sharapov V.M., Sheinov V.P. Technologies of projects management. - Cherkasy: Vertical, 2010. – 520 p.
Sharapov v.M. et al. Programmed logic controllers in the automated control systems. - Stavropol: АGRUS, 2013. – 128р.
Sharapov V., Sotula Zh., Kunitskaya L. Piezoelectric Electroacoustic Transducers. – Springer Verlag. Heidelberg, Dordrecht, London, New York, 2013. – 240 p. 
Sharapov V.М., Minaev I.G., Sotula Zh.V., Kunitskaya L.G. Electroacoustic Transducers. – Moscow: Technosphera, 2013. - 280 p.

References

20th-century Ukrainian engineers
Living people
Odesa National Polytechnic University alumni
Year of birth missing (living people)